Mackinac Island Press, is an American publisher of children's books, with an initial book called Has Anyone Seen Christmas? 
The book was featured across the country by Barnes & Noble and featured on Fox & Friends morning show, the Chicago Tribune, Associated Press and other media outlets. The book has been turned into a float for America's Thanksgiving Day Parade. Negotiations were started with Disney and other film companies to take the book to the big screen.

Progress in 2006 
In 2006, they released Gitchi Gumee, based on Henry Wadsworth Longfellow's poem, that won the Midwest Booksellers Association Children's Picture Book of the Year Honor Book Award. That year, they acquired rights to the Buck Wilder property and released their first Buck Wilder Adventure chapter books for children, and the PaleoJoe Dinosaur Detective Club series. Buck Wilder books have sold over 370,000 since their debut. The Buck Wilder character had been put into every 4th grade classroom by the State of Michigan to help make kids interested in the outdoors. The PaleoJoe brand was launched by FOX TV in a pilot test for the State of Michigan, and its success has plans by FOX to go national with the PaleoJoe Ultimate Field Trip for fall 2008.

Progress in 2007 
In 2007, those chapter books series expanded with additional books, and they also added a new series by an emerging writer, Wendy Caszatt-Allen, Adventures of Pachelot. Caszatt-Allen's writing has been called, "Like movies for the brain". She is a graduate from Interlochen Center for the Arts where many artists, musicians and writers have come from, including a large percentage of the NY Philharmonic. The first volume in the series, Last Voyage of the Griffon, had its film rights optioned by Brauer Productions, who has worked with Pixar, Fox and MTV.

2007 brought on a line of books by dollmaker, artist and author, Tracy Gallup. A Crazy Little Series by Gallup premiered with Stone Crazy, Shell Crazy, Tree Crazy and Snow Crazy, with the illustrations in the book being Gallup's handmade dolls.

In the fall of 2007, Mackinac Island Press released a book by Dan Haseltine, lead singer of Jars of Clay. The book, Magnificent Me, with Michigan illustration Joel Schoon Tanis, was also making a major move to mainstream and Christian markets. Tanis won six Regional Emmys for his children's television show, Come On Over, The book was in Ingram's Top 10 Children's bestsellers, including a number of weeks at #1 for much of that fall.

2008 and future plans 
2008 featured a book by Anne Margaret Lewis (Has Anyone Seen Christmas?), 'Twas the Night Before Summer, which was featured by libraries and bookstores across the United States.

Mackinac Island Press sold its backlist to Charlesbridge Publishing in the fall of 2009, while simultaneously licensing Printoons—an arts and crafts line that is being compared to Crayola. The non-religious rights for Printoons went to Colorbok (Wal-Mart's 2008 Vendor of the Year) and religious rights went to Thomas Nelson (the largest religious publisher in the world). Printoons products are released in spring and summer 2010. Television and clothing licenses are being worked on.

MIP also sold individual books to large New York publishers, including Harper Collins.

MIP also obtained movie rights to some large properties that are currently in negotiation.

These moves transferred MIP from a traditional publisher to a company which finds and develops brands and properties to license to other companies. In addition to Printoons, three other major brands are in development.

References

Children's book publishers